Zonneveld is a Dutch toponymic surname meaning "sun field". Variant forms are Sonneveld, Sonneveldt, Van Zonneveld, and Zonneveldt. Notable people with the surname include:

Ani Zonneveld (born 1962), Malaysian-American singer
Ben Zonneveld (born 1940), Dutch plant scientist
Jaap A. Zonneveld (1924-2016), Dutch computer scientist
 (1918–1995), Dutch geologist and physical geographer
Mike Zonneveld (born 1980), Dutch football defender
Niels Zonneveld (born 1998), Dutch darts player
Patrick Zonneveld (born 1988), Dutch football goalkeeper
Thijs Zonneveld (born 1980), Dutch racing cyclist
Wesley Zonneveld (born 1992), Dutch football goalkeeper
Sonneveld
Wim Sonneveld (1917–1974), Dutch cabaretier artist

References

Dutch-language surnames